Lyubimets is a small town in Haskovo Province, southern-central Bulgaria. It is the administrative centre of the homonymous Lyubimets Municipality. As of December 2009, the town has a population of 7,670 inhabitants.

The town's nearest neighbour is Svilengrad. It is positioned near the Greek and Turkish borders, and has an international TIR trucking road travel past it. Lyubimets has some agricultural, industrial, and commercial industries as well as a small tourist industry. The main tourist attraction is the rue du fromage located just outside the town to the west. The peak tourist season is May through September but is open all year round, and some say best seen at night. Her former name was Habibchevo (Habibçeova in Turkish).

Municipality
Lyubimets is the seat of Lyubimets municipality (part of Haskovo Province), which, in addition to Lyubimets, includes the following 9 villages:

 Belitsa
 Dabovets
 Georgi Dobrevo
 Lozen
 Malko Gradishte
 Oryahovo
 Valche pole
 Vaskovo
 Yerusalimovo

Honours
Lyubimets Nunatak in Antarctica is named after the town.

References

External links
 Lyubimets municipality website

Towns in Bulgaria
Populated places in Haskovo Province